The 2014–15 season was Wigan Athletic's second consecutive season in the Championship and fourth overall.

First team squad
As of 18 April 2015

Transfers

In

Summer

Winter

Out

Summer

Winter

Squad statistics
Statistics accurate as of 2 May 2015
Source:

Top scorers
Statistics accurate as of 2 May 2015

Football League Championship

Results

Match details

Pre-season matches

Championship
The fixtures for the 2014–15 season were announced on 18 June 2014 at 9am.

League Cup

The draw for the first round was made on 17 June 2014 at 10am. Wigan Athletic were drawn at away to Burton Albion.

FA Cup

The draw for the third round was made on 8 December 2014 at 7pm. Wigan Athletic were drawn away to local rivals Bolton Wanderers.

References

Wigan Athletic F.C. seasons
Wigan Athletic F.C.